Philosophy of sex is an aspect of applied philosophy involved with the study of sex and love. It includes both ethics of phenomena such as prostitution, rape, sexual harassment, sexual identity, the age of consent, homosexuality, and conceptual analysis of more universal questions such as "what is sex?" It also includes matters of sexuality and sexual identity and the ontological status of gender. Leading contemporary philosophers of sex include Alan Soble, Judith Butler, and Raja Halwani.

Contemporary philosophy of sex is sometimes informed by Western feminism. Issues raised by feminists regarding gender differences, sexual politics, and the nature of sexual identity are important questions in the philosophy of sex.

What is the function of sex?
What is romantic love?
Is there an essential characteristic that makes an act sexual?
Are some sexual acts good and others bad? According to what criteria? Alternatively, can consensual sexual acts be immoral, or are they outside the realm of ethics?
What is the relationship between sex and biological reproduction? Can one exist without the other?
Are sexual identities rooted in some fundamental ontological difference (such as biology)?
Is sexuality a function of gender or biological sex?

History of the philosophy of sex

Throughout much of the history of Western philosophy, questions of sex and sexuality have been considered only within the general subject of ethics. There have, however, been deviations from this pattern out of which emerge a tradition of speaking of sexual issues in their own right.

The Society for the Philosophy of Sex and Love is a professional group within the membership of the American Philosophical Association.

Sexual desire
Moral evaluations of sexual activity are determined by judgments on the nature of the sexual impulse. In this light, philosophies fall into two camps:

A negative understanding of sexuality, such as from Immanuel Kant, believes that sexuality undermines values, and challenges our moral treatment of other persons.
Sex, says Kant, "makes of the loved person an Object of appetite".
In this understanding, sex is often advised only for the purpose of procreation. Sometimes sexual celibacy is considered to lead to the best, or most moral life.

A positive understanding of sexuality – such as from Russell Vannoy, Irving Singer, Bertrand Russell in his Marriage and Morals – sees sexual activity as pleasing the self and the other at the same time.

Putative perversions 

Thomas Nagel proposes that only sexual interactions with mutual sexual arousal are natural to human sexuality. Perverted sexual encounters or events would be those in which this reciprocal arousal is absent, and in which a person remains fully a subject of the sexual experience or fully an object.

Consent

See also
 Antisexualism
 Religion and sexuality
 Sex positivism
 Society and sexuality

References

Further reading
 Aquinas, St. Thomas. Summa Theologiae. Cambridge, Eng.: Blackfriars, 1964–76.
 Augustine, St. (Aurelius). On Marriage and Concupiscence, in The Works of Aurelius Augustine, Bishop of Hippo, vol. 12, ed. Marcus Dods. Edinburgh, Scot.: T. & T. Clark, 1874.
 Baker, Robert, Kathleen Wininger, and Frederick Elliston, eds. Philosophy and Sex, 3rd edition. Amherst, N.Y.: Prometheus, 1998.
 Baumrin, Bernard. "Sexual Immorality Delineated," in Robert Baker and Frederick Elliston, eds., Philosophy and Sex, 2nd edition. Buffalo, N.Y.: Prometheus, 1984, pp. 300–11.
 Bloom, Allan. Love and Friendship. New York: Simon and Schuster, 1993.
 Buckley Jr., William F., Camille Paglia, Betty Friedan, Arianna Huffington, Michael Kinsley, et al., "Has the Women's Movement Been Disastrous?: A Firing Line Debate," in Sterling Harwood, ed., Business as Ethical and Business as Usual (Belmont, CA: Wadsworth Publishing Co., 1996).

 
 Christensen, F. M., "A Defense of Pornography," in Sterling Harwood, ed., Business as Ethical and Business as Usual (Belmont, CA: Wadsworth Publishing Co., 1996).
 Christina, Greta. "Are We Having Sex Now or What?" in Alan Soble, ed., The Philosophy of Sex, 3rd edition. Lanham, Md.: Rowman and Littlefield, 1997, pp. 3–8.
 Finnis, John. "Law, Morality, and 'Sexual Orientation'," Notre Dame Law Review 69:5 (1994), pp. 1049–76.
 Finnis, John and Martha Nussbaum. "Is Homosexual Conduct Wrong? A Philosophical Exchange," in Alan Soble, ed., The Philosophy of Sex, 3rd edition. Lanham, Md.: Rowman and Littlefield, 1997, pp. 89–94.
Foucault, Michel.  The History of Sexuality. Vols. 1-3.  New York: Vintage, 1990. (Original French publications of the three volumes in 1978, 1984, and 1984, respectively)
 Gray, Robert. "Sex and Sexual Perversion," in Alan Soble, ed., The Philosophy of Sex, 3rd edition. Lanham, Md.: Rowman and Littlefield, 1997, pp. 57–66.
 Grisez, Germain. The Way of the Lord Jesus. Quincy, Ill.: Franciscan Press, 1993.
 Gudorf, Christine. Body, Sex, and Pleasure: Reconstructing Christian Sexual Ethics. Cleveland, Ohio: Pilgrim Press, 1994.
 Hampton, Jean. "Defining Wrong and Defining Rape," in Keith Burgess-Jackson, ed., A Most Detestable Crime: New Philosophical Essays on Rape. New York: Oxford University Press, 1999, pp. 118–56.
 Held, Virginia. "Coercion and Coercive Offers," in J. Roland Pennock and John W. Chapman, eds., Coercion: Nomos VIX. Chicago, Ill.: Aldine, 1972, pp. 49–62.
 Jung, Patricia, and Ralph Smith. Heterosexism: An Ethical Challenge. Albany, N.Y.: State University of New York Press, 1993.
 Kant, Immanuel. Lectures on Ethics. Translated by Louis Infield. New York: Harper and Row, 1963.
 Kant, Immanuel. The Metaphysics of Morals. Translated by Mary Gregor. Cambridge, Eng.: Cambridge University Press, 1996.
 Lacan, Jacques. The Seminar of Jacques Lacan: On Feminine Sexuality, The Limits of Love and Knowledge, Book XX, Encore, 1972–1973, ed. Jacques-Alain Miller, trans. Bruce Fink (New York: W. W. Norton & Company, 1998).
 C. S. Lewis The Four Loves. New York: Harcourt Brace Jovanovich, 1960.
 MacKinnon, Catherine A., "The Money of Playboy Magazine," in Sterling Harwood, ed., Business as Ethical and Business as Usual (Belmont, CA: Wadsworth Publishing Co., 1996).
 Mappes, Thomas. "Sexual Morality and the Concept of Using Another Person," in Thomas Mappes and Jane Zembaty, eds., Social Ethics, 4th edition. New York: McGraw-Hill, 1992, pp. 203–26.
 Mayo, David. "An Obligation to Warn of HIV Infection?" in Alan Soble, ed., Sex, Love and Friendship. Amsterdam. Hol.: Editions Rodopi, 1997, pp. 447–53.
 McEvoy, Adrianne Leigh, Ed. Sex, Love, and Friendship. Studies of the Society for the Philosophy of Sex and Love: 1993-2003. Amsterdam/New York, NY, Rodopi, 2011.
 Muehlenhard, Charlene, and Jennifer Schrag. "Nonviolent Sexual Coercion," in A. Parrot and L. Bechhofer, eds, Acquaintance Rape. The Hidden Crime. New York: John Wiley, 1991, pp. 115–28.
 Murphy, Jeffrie. "Some Ruminations on Women, Violence, and the Criminal Law," in Jules Coleman and Allen Buchanan, eds., In Harm's Way: Essays in Honor of Joel Feinberg. Cambridge, Eng.: Cambridge University Press, 1994, pp. 209–30.
 Nagel, Thomas. "Sexual Perversion," in Alan Soble, ed., The Philosophy of Sex, 3rd edition. Lanham, Md.: Rowman and Littlefield, 1997, pp. 9–20.
 Nielson-Jones, Oliver. "Sex, Escaping The Rat Race" In G.Bennett and A.Robinson, eds., Sexual Philosophy, 2006, pp. 7–29
 O'Neill, Onora. "Between Consenting Adults," Philosophy and Public Affairs 14:3 (1985), pp. 252–77.
 Mario Perniola. The Sex Appeal of the Inorganic, Continuum, New York-London (2004), .
 Plato. Symposium. Translated by Michael Joyce, in E. Hamilton and H. Cairns, eds., The Collected Dialogues of Plato. Princeton, N.J.: Princeton University Press, 1961, pp. 526–74.
 Posner, Richard. Sex and Reason. Cambridge, Massachusetts: Harvard University Press, 1992.
 Primoratz, Igor. Ethics and Sex. London ; New York : Routledge, 1999.
 Sanders, Stephanie, and June Reinisch. "Would You Say You 'Had Sex' If . . . ?" Journal of the American Medical Association 281:3 (January 20, 1999), pp. 275–77.
 Scheer, Robert, "Bigger Breasts: The Great Implant Lie," in Sterling Harwood, ed., Business as Ethical and Business as Usual (Belmont, CA: Wadsworth Publishing Co., 1996).
 Roger Scruton. Sexual Desire: A Moral Philosophy of the Erotic. New York: Free Press, 1986.
 Singer, Irving. The Nature of Love, vol. 2: Courtly and Romantic. Chicago, Ill.: University of Chicago Press, 1984.
 Soble, Alan. "Antioch's 'Sexual Offense Policy': A Philosophical Exploration," Journal of Social Philosophy 28:1 (1997), pp. 22–36.
 Soble, Alan. The Philosophy of Sex and Love: An Introduction. St. Paul, Minn.: Paragon House, 1998. Second revised, expanded edition, 2008.
 Soble, Alan. Sexual Investigations. New York: New York University Press,1996.
 Soble, Alan, ed. Eros, Agape and Philia. New York: Paragon House, 1989. Corrected reprint, 1999.
 Soble, Alan, ed. The Philosophy of Sex, 4th edition. Lanham, Md.: Rowman and Littlefield, 2002; revised 5th edition, 2008 (excellent bibliography covering the whole area phil sex).
 Soble, Alan, ed. Sex, Love, and Friendship. Amsterdam, Hol.: Editions Rodopi, 1996.
 Solomon, Robert, and Kathleen Higgins, eds. The Philosophy of (Erotic) Love. Lawrence. Kan.: University Press of Kansas, 1991.
 Stewart, Robert M., ed. Philosophical Perspectives on Sex and Love. New York: Oxford University Press, 1995.
 Vannoy, Russell. Sex Without Love: A Philosophical Exploration. Buffalo, N.Y.: Prometheus, 1980.
 Verene, Donald, ed. Sexual Love and Western Morality, 2nd edition. Boston, Mass.: Jones and Bartlett, 1995.
 Wertheimer, Alan. "Consent and Sexual Relations," Legal Theory 2:2 (1996), pp. 89–112.
 Pope John Paul II. Love and Responsibility. New York: Farrar, Straus and Giroux, 1981.

External links
Internet encyclopedia of philosophy: philosophy of sex (also by Soble)
Society for the Philosophy of Sex and Love
Bibliography: Traditions in the Cultural Representation of Love, Sex, Gender, and the Body: c.100 BC - 1500 AD

 
Social philosophy